Rebecca Lowe (born 11 November 1980) is an English-American television presenter and anchor who works for NBC and NBC Sports. She previously worked at the BBC, Setanta Sports and ESPN.

Early life and education
The daughter of BBC News presenter Chris Lowe, she was born in Ealing, west London, where she reportedly walked to school with footballer Peter Crouch. Lowe attended Notting Hill & Ealing High School then Mercersburg Academy in Pennsylvania, United States on an English-Speaking Union scholarship. She graduated with a 2:1 BA Honours Degree in Drama from the University of East Anglia in 2002.

Career
Seeking to be an actress, she worked on graduation at TalkSport while looking for an agent. In November 2002, she won BBC Television's Talent Search for a football reporter.

BBC
Lowe reported from a top Premier League match every Saturday for Final Score, was regularly a reporter on interviews and features for Football Focus, and was the presenter of a "Football in the Community" feature every Sunday morning on Match of the Day (all on BBC One).

She was a regular contributor to BBC Television's Match of the Day 2 and Grandstand. She was also one of the main sports presenters on BBC News 24 and BBC Radio Five Live, and has additionally broadcast sports news for BBC Breakfast, BBC Radio 1, 2 and 4.

Lowe worked as BBC One's England team reporter during the 2005 Women's European Championship, and was a reporter for BBC Two at the 2004 African Cup of Nations in Tunisia. She also performed the role of pitch side reporter at the FA Women's Cup Final in 2003, 2004 and 2005, which was shown live on BBC One. Lowe reported from the 2006 FIFA World Cup in Germany.

Setanta Sports
It was announced on 28 June 2007 that Lowe would leave the BBC to join Setanta Sports as a football presenter and reporter. She co-hosted Setanta's coverage of the Football Conference as well as reporting on the Premier League and co-presenting Football Matters, Setanta's Monday night football discussion and review show, alongside James Richardson.

ESPN
After the demise of Setanta, it was announced in July 2009, that she had joined ESPN's new UK sports channel, to co-host their new Premier League football coverage, alongside Ray Stubbs, who joined ESPN from the BBC. At ESPN she became the first woman in the UK to host the FA Cup Final, presenting a 7-hour broadcast pitch side from the 2012 FA Cup Final between Chelsea and Liverpool. She was also there for ESPN when the Bolton Wanderers midfielder Fabrice Muamba collapsed on the pitch at White Hart Lane during an FA Cup quarter-final in March 2012. She co-hosted the network's telecasts of the 2011 FIFA Women's World Cup alongside Bob Ley. In January 2011, she hosted the FA Cup third round game between Arsenal and Leeds United with Robbie Savage and Martin Keown. At half time Savage was showered with hot dogs and coins by Leeds fans. In June 2012 she appeared on US television as co-host of ESPN's US coverage of UEFA Euro 2012. Lowe also sporadically presented ESPN USA's Premier League coverage.

NBC
On 26 March 2013, NBC Sports hired Lowe to serve as the lead studio host for its coverage of the Premier League in the United States, beginning in the 2013–14 season. In December 2013, Rebecca was named Newcomer of the Year by Sports Illustrated in their annual Media Awards. NBC later renewed her contract with the network through 2022. Lowe is also the Daytime host at NBC for all coverage of both Summer and Winter Olympic Games. She has fronted Sochi 2014, Rio 2016, Pyeong Chang 2018, Tokyo 2020, and Beijing 2022.

Personal life
On 22 December 2008, while presenting Football Matters, Lowe confirmed she is an avid supporter of Crystal Palace.  She has confirmed this in several appearances with the Men in Blazers.  

Lowe's brother Alex Lowe is a sports journalist for The Times.

On 12 June 2013, Lowe married former Torquay United, Luton Town and Cheltenham Town manager Paul Buckle in a private ceremony in Santorini, Greece.

Lowe gave birth to her first child, Edward "Teddy" Christopher Buckle, on 17 April 2016.

On 9 March 2022, Lowe announced via her Instagram account that both she and her husband had officially received their American citizenship.

References

Bibliography

External links
 Rebecca Lowe (biography) – NBC Sports Group

1980 births
Living people
People from Ealing
English sports broadcasters
Alumni of the University of East Anglia
English television presenters
BBC newsreaders and journalists
English association football commentators
People educated at Notting Hill & Ealing High School
English expatriates in the United States
Olympic Games broadcasters
Association footballers' wives and girlfriends